The 2011 UK Open Qualifier 4 was the fourth of eight 2011 UK Open Darts Qualifiers which was held at the Robin Park Tennis Centre in Wigan on Sunday 13 March.

Prize money

Draw

References

4